Cape Agrilia, anciently Malea or Malia (Μαλία) or Mania (Μανία), is the southeasternmost point of the island of Lesbos. It is also known as Agrelias.

Immediately opposite, on the mainland, is Kane Peninsula (anciently known as Cane, Aega, or Aiga) now in Turkey, and the Arginusae islands. It is a high and conspicuous point at sea. Xenophon says that the fleet of Callicratidas occupied this station before the sea-fight off Arginusae. There is some obscurity in Xenophon's topography in reference to this place. Thucydides is more confused; he says distinctly that Malea lay to the north of Mytilene, which is inconsistent with the position of Cape Agrilia. Possibly the Malea of Thucydides had some connection with the sanctuary of Apollo Maloeis.

References

Landforms of Lesbos
Agrilia